This article is a list of universities and colleges in Beijing. There are at least 90 establishments of higher education in the Chinese capital, the first city with most higher education institutions nationwide. Most of the colleges and universities are public or affiliated; only a few are privately established.

Others 
 Beijing International Chinese College 
 Central Academy of Arts and Design , merged into Tsinghua University as Academy of Arts and Design of Tsinghua University in 1999
 École centrale de Pékin, created in Beijing in 2005
 Peking Medical University, merged into Peking University in 2000
 Yenching University, re-organized and mainly merged into Peking University in 1952, some of the departments merged into Tsinghua University and Renmin University of China

References

External links 
List of Chinese Higher Education Institutions — Ministry of Education
List of Chinese universities, including official links
Beijing Institutions admitting International Students

Beijing
University
Beijing